Jack Brewer (born January 8, 1979) is a former American football safety who played professionally in the National Football League (NFL) for the Minnesota Vikings, the New York Giants, the Philadelphia Eagles, and the Arizona Cardinals. He attended Grapevine High School in Grapevine, Texas where he competed in football and track.

Early life
Born in Fort Worth, Texas, Brewer grew up in nearby Grapevine and graduated from Grapevine High School in 1997. Brewer lettered in football and track in high school. As a senior wide receiver in 1996, Brewer had 48 catches for 776 yards and nine touchdowns on a 15–0 team that won the University Interscholastic League 4A state title.

College career
As a freshman, Brewer attended Southern Methodist University (SMU) where he played wide receiver and was an All-American Candidate and a Disney World Record Holder for track. He had 19 receptions for 352 yards and four touchdowns in the season for the SMU Mustangs in 1997. Brewer transferred to the University of Minnesota after one year at SMU. At Minnesota, Brewer redshirted the 1998 season per NCAA transfer rules before starting 10 games at free safety as a redshirt sophomore in 1999. 

In 2000, Brewer returned to wide receiver as a junior and was third on the team with 22 catches for 286 yards.  He switched to defensive back in 2001 and finished that season with 155 tackles, the fourth highest single-season total in school history.

Senior captain Brewer was a first-team selection at defensive back by the media after leading the Big Ten Conference in tackles with 14.1 per game and 16.2 per game for Big Ten contests. He earned the Carl Eller Award for outstanding defensive player, and the Paul Giel Award for most unselfish player with most concern for the university. He was also selected to play in the East–West Shrine Game.

Brewer earned his bachelor's and master's degrees from the University of Minnesota.

Professional career

In 2002, Brewer was signed by the Minnesota Vikings as a free agent. In his first year with the Vikings, Brewer played in 15 games and had one start. He led the team with 26 special teams tackles, five tackles against the Buffalo Bills which tied him for second most in a game in team history and the most special teams tackles in a game since Harold Morrow's five against Tampa Bay. Brewer had both of his two career interceptions that same year.

In Brewer's second year with the Vikings, he played in six games; he was inactive for the first three games of the season after suffering a chest injury in preseason. On October 26, 2003, he blocked a Jeff Feagles punt against the New York Giants – the Vikings' first blocked punt since 1989. The Vikings waived Brewer on March 17, 2004.

On March 18, 2004, Brewer signed with the New York Giants off waivers.

Signing with the team on November 16 to replace the injured Sean Considine, Brewer played in six games with the Philadelphia Eagles in 2005 and finished tied for fifth on the team with 15 special teams tackles and twice led the team with four special teams tackles.

Brewer signed a one-year contract with the Arizona Cardinals on April 28, 2006. However, he was placed on injured reserve on September 2.

Business career
After leaving the NFL, Brewer became a wealth manager at the global private client group of Merrill Lynch. In 2009, Brewer founded Brewer Group Inc., which has been variously described as a consulting firm and an investment advisory firm.

Insider trading investigation 
In August 2020, the U.S. Securities and Exchange Commission (SEC) filed civil insider trading charges against Brewer in the U.S. District Court for the Southern District of New York. The SEC alleged that Brewer sold 100,000 shares in a penny stock, COPsync, after receiving confidential information indicating that the share price was likely to drop, and that Brewer "profited by approximately $35,000 more than he otherwise would have." Brewer did consulting work for COPsync which promoted a messaging system for law enforcement, described as an "Amber Alert for police officers." Brewer had also recruited eight former and current athletes to promote the company. COPsync went bankrupt in 2017, and in 2018 the SEC revoked the registration of the company's stock.

Political advocacy
Brewer once supported Barack Obama, but later pledged support for Donald Trump. He called Trump the "first black president" and met with him at Trump's Bedminster Golf resort in June 2019. In late 2019, Brewer predicted that there would be a "black awakening" which would lead to Trump receiving 20% or more of the African-American vote in the 2020 presidential election, after Trump had won 8% of the African-American vote during the previous presidential election, in 2016. Trump would receive 12% of the African-American vote in 2020. Brewer frequently appeared on Fox News to promote Trump, became a member of the "Black Voices for Trump" group, and tweeted that "Trump has done more for blacks than any [President] since Lincoln." Brewer spoke at the 2020 Republican National Convention.

Personal life
Brewer is a Christian, stating in an interview that "[m]y journey was one where I had to use life experiences to bring me closer to Jesus Christ."

References

External links
 The Brewer Group profile

1979 births
Living people
American football safeties
Minnesota Golden Gophers football players
Minnesota Vikings players
New York Giants players
Philadelphia Eagles players
SMU Mustangs football players
Harvard Business School alumni
Players of American football from Fort Worth, Texas
People from Grapevine, Texas
American Christians